Brian James Looney (born September 26, 1969) is a retired Major League Baseball pitcher. He played during three seasons at the major league level for the Montreal Expos and Boston Red Sox. He was drafted by the Expos in the 10th round of the 1991 amateur draft.

Looney played his first professional season with their Class A (Short Season) Jamestown Expos in 1991, and his last with the Nashua Pride of the independent Atlantic League in 2005. He played his last affiliated season with the Colorado Rockies' Triple-A Colorado Springs Sky Sox in 2003.
In the last part of his career, he has played in Italian Serie A1 for T&A San Marino.

References

External links

1969 births
Living people
Albany Polecats players
Altoona Curve players
American expatriate baseball players in Canada
American expatriate baseball players in Mexico
Baseball players from New Haven, Connecticut
Boston College Eagles baseball players
Boston Red Sox players
Bridgeport Bluefish players
Buffalo Bisons (minor league) players
Calgary Cannons players
Colorado Springs Sky Sox players
Columbus Clippers players
American expatriate baseball players in Italy
American expatriate baseball players in San Marino
Harrisburg Senators players
Jamestown Expos players
Major League Baseball pitchers
Mexican League baseball pitchers
Montreal Expos players
Nashua Pride players
Nashville Sounds players
Norwich Navigators players
Ottawa Lynx players
Pawtucket Red Sox players
Rochester Red Wings players
Rockford Expos players
Rimini Baseball Club players
Salt Lake Buzz players
Scranton/Wilkes-Barre Red Barons players
T & A San Marino players
Tigres de la Angelopolis players
Toledo Mud Hens players
West Palm Beach Expos players